Adamstuen is a neighborhood in the borough of St. Hanshaugen in Oslo, Norway. It is located south of Ullevål University Hospital. It is served by Adamstuen Station of the Oslo Tramway.  In the Summer of 2009, the uber-hip Monocle magazine featured Thereses gate (running through the heart of Adamstuen) as Oslo's most unusual street.

The name
The property was owned by the storekeeper Adam R. Steen (dead 1807), the last element is the finite form of stue m 'cabin, house with one single room'. (See also > Majorstuen.)

Neighbourhoods of Oslo